Passiflora subg. Astrophea is a group of Passiflora species that are liana, shrub and trees found in South America.

Species

References

Masters, M.T. 1871: Transactions of the Linnean Society of London 27: 629.

External links